Deconstructed club, also known as post-club or deconstructed music is an experimental style of electronic dance music characterized by a post-modernist approach and an abrasive or dystopian tone. It stands opposed to the tropes of mainstream club styles, often dispensing with four-on-the-floor beats and stable tempo while mixing eclectic or abrasive sources.

History 
The style was born in New York dance parties named GHE20G0TH1K, which started in 2009. These parties featured voguers, punks, and fashionista, took place in warehouses across Brooklyn and Manhattan and started to radicalize the city's nightclub scene within a year. The style that defined the deconstructed club movement was directly shaped by the possibilities of CDJs, and DJ sets, in turn, have inspired producers to imitate this chaotic experimentation in their own music, creating feedback that continued to re-imagine the expectations of the dance-floor music.

The MP3s used by DJs on GHE20G0TH1K had a crunchy, cruddy texture while being played on a big sound system, which came to define their aesthetic. Each member of the collective came from a different background, but they incorporated those differences into the mix, hybridizing a melange of Jersey club, Baltimore, Footwork, Grime, and Ballroom music, as well as elements of House and Techno. Because of Deconstructed club's relationship to vogue and prominent LGBTQ originators, the genre's identity is tied to the underground party scene in NYC and alternative queer nightlife.

Artists from the labels Fade to Mind and Keysound, who mixed together rebooted ballroom/vogue house, jersey club, and the new wave of instrumental grime with a stark, hi-tech machine sheen are also cited as pioneers of the genre.

The term itself started circulating in the mid-2010s and was used as an umbrella term to describe a disparate, international genus of producers pushing the limits or boundaries of club music and tapping into the avant-garde.

Characteristics 
The genre steps away from traditional and mainstream dance music tropes, such as four on the floor beats, stable tempos, build-ups, and drops. Instead, it is identified by an aggressive, frantic, post-industrial sound design, featuring metallic or staccato sounds such as samples of glass smashing or gunshots. Deconstructed club aims for an excessive, apocalyptic-sounding soundscape, with constant rhythmic switch-ups and atonality.

Deconstructed club proposes a chaotic mix and a sonic canvas where ballroom samples, field recordings, a cappella rapping and industrial soundscapes are adjusted into dance-floor music. The genre is characterized by its disruptive elements and a wide dynamic tempo range, often utilizing jersey club kick-patterns, grime claps, and jittery footwork production to create a sensation of frenetic high-BPM tracks. In addition, tracks delve into experimental soundscapes and alternating atmospheric breathers. The genre's ethos and ideas are decidedly post-structuralist towards conventional music production and dance music.

In Latin America, deconstructed club is often influenced by Latin American and Afro-Caribbean sounds like reggaeton, baile funk, dancehall, and trival, such as the work of Arca, a Venezuelan artist whose song "KLK" (featuring Rosalía) has notable dembow influence. The label NAAFI in Mexico has numerous artists who mix genres such as trival and reggaeton to reformulate deconstructed club music.

Visual art 
The music is often accompanied by music videos with visual art. Some of the artists studied visual arts rather than music. The visuals are often abstract and feature mutational, grotesque, and decomposing forms. This cross between the visuals and experimental electronic music has become so prominent that one of the key labels in the genre, PAN, has launched an imprint, "Entopia", dedicated to producing soundtracks for art installations, films, theater works, dance, and fashion podiums.

Reception
The music journalist and critic Simon Reynolds called the style conceptronica and said that "it isn't a genre as such, but more like a mode of artistic operation". He contrasted the genre with 1990s IDM, saying that early IDM from those like Aphex Twin or Luke Vibert tended to be more down-to-earth, relaxing, and rife with juvenile humor, rather than demanding and intellectually charged.

References

Further reading
 

21st-century music genres
2010s in music
Electronic dance music genres
Electronic music genres
Experimental music genres